The 2015 Fresno State Bulldogs football team represented California State University, Fresno in the 2015 NCAA Division I FBS football season. The Bulldogs were led by fourth-year head coach Tim DeRuyter and played their home games at Bulldog Stadium. They were members of the Mountain West Conference in the West Division. They finished the season 3–9, 2–6 in Mountain West play to finish in a tie for fourth place in the West Division.

Schedule

Schedule Source:

Game summaries

Abilene Christian

at Ole Miss

Utah

San Jose State

at San Diego State

Utah State

UNLV

at Air Force

Nevada

at Hawaii

at BYU

Colorado State

References

Fresno State
Fresno State Bulldogs football seasons
Fresno State Bulldogs football